Dunnose may refer to
 Dunnose Head, West Falkland, a small settlement
 Dunnose, Isle of Wight, a headland used in navigation